Pseudophryne is a genus of small myobatrachid frogs. All of these frogs are small terrestrial frogs, and as such, most species are commonly called toadlets (pseudo- meaning deceptive, phryne meaning toad). The genus comprises thirteen species, ten from eastern Australia, and three from Western Australia. Species within the genus Pseudophryne lay their eggs on moist ground. The tadpoles develop within the eggs, and once they reach hatching size, will become dormant. Once sufficient rain occurs to flush the eggs into a creek or river, the eggs will hatch and release tadpoles into the water. Many of the species within this genus have the ability to form hybrids.

Species
The following species are recognised in the genus Pseudophryne:

References

 
Myobatrachidae
Amphibian genera
Taxa named by Leopold Fitzinger